Maurizio Cattelan (born 21 September 1960) is an Italian visual artist. Known primarily for his hyperrealistic sculptures and installations, Cattelan's practice also includes curating and publishing. His satirical approach to art has resulted in him being frequently labelled as a joker or prankster of the art world.  Self-taught as an artist, Cattelan has exhibited internationally in museums and Biennials. In 2011 the Guggenheim Museum, New York presented a retrospective of his work. Some of Cattelan's better-known works include America, consisting of a solid gold toilet; La Nona Ora, a sculpture depicting a fallen Pope who has been hit by a meteorite; and Comedian, a fresh banana duct-taped to a wall.

Early life and education
Cattelan was born on 21 September 1960 in Padua, Italy.  He was raised there by his mother, a cleaning lady, and his father, a truck driver. He started his career in the early 1980s by designing and producing wooden furniture in Forlì (Italy). Cattelan has no formal training in art. He has said that in addition to reading art catalogues, "making shows has been my school".

Art practice 

Humour and satire are at the core of Cattelan's work; this approach has often seen him labelled variously as an art scene joker, jester or prankster. He has been described by Jonathan P. Binstock, curator of contemporary art at the Corcoran Gallery of Art "as one of the great post-Duchampian artists and a smartass, too". Discussing the topic of originality with ethnographer, Sarah Thornton, Cattelan explained, "Originality doesn't exist by itself. It is an evolution of what is produced. ... Originality is about your capacity to add." His work was often based on simple puns or subverts clichéd situations by, for example, substituting animals for people in sculptural tableaux. "Frequently morbidly fascinating, Cattelan's humour sets his work above the visual pleasure one-liners," wrote Carol Vogel of the New York Times.

Cattelan's first artwork has been noted as a photo art piece in 1989 entitled Lessico Familiare (Family Syntax), a framed self-portrait in which he is depicted forming a Hand Heart over his naked chest.

Cattelan is commonly noted for his use of taxidermy during the mid-1990s. Novecento (1997) consists of the taxidermied body of a former racehorse named Tiramisu, which hangs by a harness in an elongated, drooping posture. Another work utilizing taxidermy is Bidibidobidiboo (1996), a miniature depiction of a squirrel slumped over its kitchen table, a handgun at its feet.

In 1999 he started making life-size wax effigies of various subjects, including himself. One of his best known sculptures, La Nona Ora (1999), consists of an effigy of Pope John Paul II in full ceremonial costume being crushed by a meteor.

Curating
In 1999, he curated with Jens Hoffmann on the Caribbean Biennial.

In 2002 he co-founded "The Wrong Gallery", a glass door leading to a 2.5 square foot exhibition space at 516A½ West 20th street in New York City. After the building housing the gallery was sold, the door and gallery was put on display within the collection of the Tate Modern until 2009.

With long-term collaborators Ali Subotnick and Massimiliano Gioni, Cattelan also curated the 2006 Berlin Biennale. Articles by Cattelan frequently appear in international publications such as Flash Art.

Publishing
From 1996–2007 Cattelan collaborated with Dominique Gonzalez-Foster and Paola Manfrin on the publication Permanent Food, an occasional journal consisting of a pastiche of pages torn from other magazines and submissions by artists of similar material. From 2002 he collaborated on the satirical arts journal Charley, a series on contemporary artists.

In 2009, Cattelan teamed up with Italian photographer Pierpaolo Ferrari to create an editorial for W magazine's Art Issue.

In 2010, they founded the magazine Toiletpaper, a bi-annual, picture-based publication. As part of a public art series at the High Line in 2012, Toiletpaper was commissioned with a billboard at the corner of 10th Avenue and West 18th Street in New York, showing an image of a woman's manicured and jeweled fingers, detached from their hands, emerging from a vibrant blue velvet background. In 2014, Cattelan and Ferrari produced a fashion spread for the Spring Fashion issue of New York.

In the project entitled 1968, A Toiletpaper collaboration between Maurizio Cattelan, Pierpaolo Ferrari and the Deste Foundation in Athens, Cattelan celebrates the works and time of Dakis Joannou and his collection of radical design.

Toilet Paper differs from the two previously magazine projects, as its photographs were planned and designated solely for the magazine. The level of originality for this magazine surpassed the others, providing the audience vague, oddly familiar photographs to peruse through. Toilet Paper is a surrealist pantomime of images that the viewer cannot easily trace back to a starting point, while they've most likely been conjured by popular culture. It is a whirlwind of loud colors mixed in with the occasional black-and-white photo: "the pictures probe the unconscious, tapping into sublimated perversions and spasms of violence."

Selected works 

Working Is a Bad Job (1993): At the 1993 Venice Biennale he leased his allotted space to an advertising agency, which installed a billboard promoting a new perfume.
 Errotin, le vrai Lapin (1995), in which he persuaded his gallerist Emmanuel Perrotin to wear a giant pink rabbit costume shaped like a phallus to Cattelan's gallery opening
 Another Fucking Readymade (1996): As a profound example of a found art hall; for an exhibition at the de Appel Arts Center in Amsterdam, he stole the entire contents of another artist's show from a nearby gallery with the idea of passing it off as his own work, until the police insisted he return the loot on threat of arrest.
 Turisti (1997), taxidermied pigeons and fake pigeon feces exhibited in the Italian Pavilion at the Venice Biennale of 1997
 In 1997, at the Consortium in Dijon, Cattelan dug a coffin-shaped hole in the floor of the museum's main gallery.
  Mother (1999); at the 1999 Venice Biennale, Cattelan executed this piece, a project that involved an Indian fakir, who practiced a daily ritual of being buried beneath sand in a small room, with only his clasped hands visible.
 Untitled (2001), installation created for the Museum Boijmans Van Beuningen in Rotterdam that depicts the artist peering mischievously from a hole in the floor at a gallery of 17th-century Dutch masters.
 Him (2001): a sculpture resembling a schoolboy kneeling in prayer, except that the head has been replaced with the realistic likeness of Adolf Hitler.
 As part of the 2001 Venice Biennale, he erected a full sized HOLLYWOOD sign over the largest rubbish tip on Palermo, Sicily.

 La rivoluzione siamo noi (We Are The Revolution) (2000), features a miniature Maurizio Cattelan, dangling from a Marcel Breuer–designed clothing rack. In this depiction, Cattelan contrasts the German artist Joseph Beuys statement, "every man is an artist", with his own, "I am not an artist". 
 Don't Forget to Call Your Mother (2000), is a photograph by Cattelan that was utilized as a show invitation card, upon its introduction, by the Marian Goodman Gallery in New York City. "The sign ironically reminds customers of their mothers' worries each time they approach the bar to drink...in mimicking this stern parental directive, the sign draws on attitudes regarding authority, independence, and disobedience" (Susan Thompson).
 Daddy, Daddy (2008) was initially premiered in the group exhibition theanyspacewhatever (2008–09) at the Guggenheim Museum. The piece was a site-specific installation in a small pool at the bottom of the Frank Lloyd Wright atrium rotunda, where a life-size Pinocchio doll lay face-down, giving the impression that he had jumped or fallen from above. "Cattelan's life-size effigy of a beloved fairytale character lying face down in the museum's fountain reads as a crime scene replete with questions of intent: suicide, homicide, or ill-planned escape?" 
 L.O.V.E. (2011), a  white marble sculpture middle finger sticking straight up from an otherwise fingerless hand, pointing away from Borsa Italiana in Milan.

 Turisti (2011), for the 2011 Venice Biennale, was made of 2,000 embalmed pigeons, not to be confused with the similarly-named Turisti (1997).
America (2016), an 18-karat solid gold toilet. In September 2017, after the Solomon R. Guggenheim Museum declined a Trump Administration White House request to loan it Van Gogh's 1888 painting Landscape with Snow for the President's private rooms, the museum chief curator Nancy Spector offered to loan them America  instead.  On September 14, the work was stolen while installed at Blenheim Palace in the United Kingdom, where it was available for use as part of an exhibition of Cattelan's works, (while on loan from the permanent collection of the Solomon R Guggenheim  Museum in New York City).  It had been placed in a water closet formerly used by Winston Churchill. As the work had been connected to the building's water pipes, the theft therein caused structural damage and flooding. A man was arrested in connection with the incident. Cattelan later commented: "I always liked heist movies and finally I'm in one of them."
Comedian (2019), a banana duct taped to a wall, shown at Art Basel Miami and the edible part then there by the Georgian artist David Datuna (1974-2022) in a performance art called Hungry Artist
Blind (2021), a memorial to the events of September 11, 2001 consisting of black resin monolith representing one of the World Trade Center towers intersected by the silhouette of a jetliner

Exhibitions

Solo exhibitions
Migros Museum für Gegenwartskunst, Zurich (2000)
Centre Georges Pompidou, Paris
The Kunsthalle Basel, Basel (1999)
Project 65 at the Museum of Modern Art, New York (1999)
Castello di Rivoli, Turin (1997)
Le Consortium, Dijon
Hôtel des Monnaies, Paris (2017)
Wiener Secession, Vienna (1997)
Skulptur Projekte Münster (1997)
Museum of Contemporary Art, Los Angeles (2003)
Museum Ludwig, Cologne (2003)
Untitled at the Nicola Trussardi Foundation (2004)
Breath Ghosts Blind at the Pirelli HangarBicocca in Milan, Italy (2021)

Retrospectives
A major retrospective titled All, assembling 130 objects of Cattelan's career since 1989, opened in 2011 at the Solomon R. Guggenheim Museum, New York. On the occasion of the exhibition, Cattelan announced his early retirement.

In 2016 the Monnaie de Paris his retrospective of his work titled Not Afraid of Love.

Biennials
Cattelan has participated in the Venice Biennale (1993, 1997, 1999, and 2001), Manifesta 2 (1998), Luxembourg, Melbourne International Biennial 1999, and the 2004 Whitney Biennial in New York.

Art market
At a Sotheby's auction in 2004, Cattelan's Ballad of Trotsky (1996), a taxidermic horse suspended by ropes from a ceiling, was sold for $2 million, a record for the artist.

Recognition
Cattelan was a finalist for the Guggenheim's Hugo Boss Prize in 2000, received an honorary degree in Sociology from the University of Trento, Italy. In 2004, he was awarded the Arnold Bode prize from the Kunstverein Kassel, Germany. A career prize (a gold medal) was awarded to Maurizio Cattelan by the 15th Rome Quadriennale. On 24 March 2009, at the MAXXI Museum of Rome, singer and musician Elio came to receive the prize, claiming to be the real Cattelan.

Film 
A documentary film titled Maurizio Cattelan: Be Right Back was released in 2017. The film premiered at the Tribeca Film Festival, and played in theaters in 2017. The film, directed by Maura Axelrod, featured curator Massimiliano Gioni standing in for Cattelan. It followed Cattelan's career retrospective at the Solomon R. Guggenheim Museum in New York.

Television 
On the occasion of his 2011 retrospective at the Guggenheim Museum in New York, Cattelan was profiled on the American television program 60 Minutes. In 2016 a documentary about his life and work, The Art World's Prankster: Maurizio Cattelan, aired on BBC.

Controversies
Cattelan was represented hanged with a noose around his neck in 2010 in the Vatican by the Sicilian artist Giuseppe Veneziano.

In 2017, when the Trump administration White House requested the loan of a Vincent van Gogh painting, from the Guggenheim collection, Landscape With Snow, the museum's chief curator Nancy Spector suggested instead Cattelan's  work America, a sculpture of a gold toilet.

On December 7, 2019, Comedian, an artwork created by Cattelan in an edition of three for the 2019 installment of Art Basel Miami Beach consisting of a banana held to a wall by duct tape, sold to an unnamed French art collector for $120,000 US.  The fruit in the work was later summarily eaten by Georgian performance artist David Datuna, who called his piece Hungry Artist. Meanwhile Galerie Perrotin, which is exhibiting the piece, replaced the fruit and stated that it is an "idea", while Datuna said "it was very delicious".

References

Further reading 

 Giorgio Verzotti, Maurizio Cattelan, Milan, Charta Art Books, 1997, 
 Laura Hoptman and Madeleine Schuppli, Maurizio Cattelan, Basel, Kunsthalle, 1999. 
 Maurizio Cattelan and Jens Hoffmann, 6th Caribbean Biennal, Dijon, Les presses du réel, 2001, 
 Francesco Bonami, Nancy Spector, Barbara Vanderlinden and Massimiliano Gioni, Maurizio Cattelan, London, Phaidon Press, 2003, 
 Maurizio Cattelan, Massimiliano Gioni and Ali Subotnick, Of Mice and Men, Berlin, Hatje Cantz, 2006, 
 Franklin Sirmans, Maurizio Cattelan: Is There Life After Death?, Yale University Press, 2011, 
 Nancy Spector, Maurizio Cattelan: All, New York, Guggenheim Museum, 2011, 
 Maurizio Cattelan, Myriam Ben Salah and Marta Papini, Shit and Die, Bologna, Damiani, 2015. 
 Michael Frahm and Paolo Fabbri, Victory is Not an Option: Maurizio Cattelan at Blenheim Palace, Blenheim Art Foundation, 2019 
 Roberta Tenconi, Vicente Todolí, Francesco Bonami, Nancy Spector, Arnon Grunberg, Andrea Pinotti and Timothy Verdon, Maurizio Cattelan: Breath Ghosts Blind, Venice, Marsilio, 2021. 
 Maurizio Cattelan, Marta Papini, Michele Robecchi, Roberta Tenconi, Vicente Todolí and Fiammetta Griccioli, Maurizio Cattelan: Index, Venice, Marsilio, 2021. 

1960 births
Living people
20th-century Italian sculptors
20th-century Italian male artists
Italian male sculptors
21st-century Italian sculptors
Italian contemporary artists
Postmodern artists
Artists from Padua
Italian magazine founders
Italian magazine editors
21st-century Italian male artists